The 2018 Colgate Raiders football team represented Colgate University in the 2018 NCAA Division I FCS football season. They were led by fifth-year head coach Dan Hunt and played their home games at Crown Field at Andy Kerr Stadium. They were a member of the Patriot League. They finished the season 10–2, 6–0 in Patriot League play to be Patriot League champions. They received the Patriot League's automatic bid to the FCS Playoffs where, after a first round bye, they defeated James Madison in the second round before losing in the quarterfinals to North Dakota State. Following the season, they were awarded the Lambert Division I FCS Cup by the Eastern College Athletic Conference and the Metropolitan New York Football Writers, signifying the Raiders as the best team in the East in Division I FCS.

Previous season
The Raiders finished the 2017 season 7–4, 5–1 in Patriot League play to finish in a tie for the Patriot League championship with Lehigh. Due to their head-to-head loss over Lehigh, they did not receive a bid to the FCS Playoffs.

Preseason

Award watch lists

Preseason coaches poll
The Patriot League released their preseason coaches poll on July 26, 2018, with the Raiders predicted to finish as Patriot League champions.

Preseason All-Patriot League team
The Raiders placed ten players on the preseason all-Patriot League team.

Offense

James Holland, Jr. – RB

Thomas Ives – WR

Max Hartzman – OL

Jovaun Woolford – OL

Defense

Nick Wheeler – DL

T.J. Holl – LB

Tyler Castillo – DB

Abu Daramy-Swaray – DB

Alec Wisniewski – DB

Special teams

Chris Puzzi – K

Schedule

Game summaries

Holy Cross

at New Hampshire

Lafayette

at William & Mary

at Bucknell

Cornell

Georgetown

at Fordham

at Lehigh

at Army

FCS Playoffs

James Madison–Second Round

at North Dakota State–Quarterfinals

Ranking movements

References

Colgate
Colgate Raiders football seasons
Patriot League football champion seasons
Colgate
Colgate Raiders football